The governance of the National Union of Students, the organisation which is the main confederation of students' unions within the United Kingdom, has recently undergone radical reform. The article explains the background to the reform process and the current system of governance.

Background
Debates over governance reform dominated the National Conference of 2008. Reform proposals were rejected in 2008 in a vote where 692 voted for the proposals and 358 voted against, but a two-thirds majority was required. The Guardian characterised the reform proposals as 'Blairite'. Critics of the reforms characterised them as an attack on the democratic structure of the organisation. that would lead to a reduction in minority representation.
Supporters argued that the reform proposals would replace an outdated system of governance and lead to a more innovative corporate structure. Two extraordinary conferences were held to ratify the reform proposals a measure criticised as undemocratic given that there is no requirement for students unions to hold cross-campus elections for extraordinary conferences. The first extraordinary conference was held in Leicester where the reforms passed. The second conference was held in Wolverhampton where  614 delegates at the conference voting in favour of the proposals and 142 voted against them.

Full-time officers
The current president of the National Union of Students is Larissa Kennedy. The other positions are vice-president higher education, vice-president further education, and vice-president liberation and equality. Each vice-president leads a distinct zone within the organisational structure of the NUS. There are also a president for each nation, the president for NUS Wales, the president for NUS Scotland, and the president for NUS-USI.

National Executive Council
The National Executive Council (NEC) is NUS’ interim decision making body between meetings of the union's National Conference. It comprises elected representatives and officers from each of NUS’ Zones, Student Sections, Liberation Campaigns and Nations as well as 15 individually elected members and the National President.

Block of 15
The 15 individually elected members are known as the "Block of 15"/ The Block of 15 is made up of 15 members five of which are reserved for members of further education institutions.

†Further education

Zones
Up until 2019, there was five policy zones.
Higher Education 
Further Education
Union Development 
Welfare
Society and Citizenship

Each zone was made up of a committee of elected students.

Since the 2020 National Conference, this was changed to:

 Higher Education
 Further Education
 Liberation and Equality

Annual Conference
The National Union of Students holds an annual conference each year. All affiliated Students' Unions are able to send delegates to the conference, the number of delegates each Union can send being proportional to its membership size. Higher Education Unions are required to elect their delegates, Further Education and Small and Specialist Unions are able to appoint.

Liberation campaigns

There is an NUS Liberation Conference which combines all 5 NUS liberation caucuses:

 Black Students Campaign
 Disabled Students Campaign
 LGBT+ Students Campaign
 Trans Students Campaign
 Women Students Campaign

Trustee Board
According to the NUS the role of the Trustee Board is as follows:

[The] Trustee Board will work to ensure a sound, healthy and legally compliant organisation - allowing an elected Executive Council of students to concentrate on campaigning and representing students with confidence and integrity.

The Trustee Board is made up of:

The NUS President
The five other members of the National Executive Council
Six members elected at NUS National Conference
Four lay trustees selected on the basis of their skills and experience

Democratic Procedures Committee
The Democratic Procedures Committee are a committee elected at NUS national Conference to ensure that the NUS' democratic procedures are followed. The nomination form for election to the Democratic Procedures Committee describes the remit of the committee as thus:
[The] Democratic Procedures Committee are responsible for the democracy of
NUS - the accessibility of its conference and the fair policy processes of the
National Union as a whole. Among other things they are responsible for the motions and amendments
process, the accessibility of the Conference venue for all delegates and the
administration of conference procedures during the meeting itself.

The Democratic Procedures Committee were criticised for their decision to cut the delegation size of some universities at NUS Conference, a move which is seen as reducing the diversity of delegations sent to conference. Supporters of this decision argue that it addresses a long-standing imbalance between delegate sizes for higher education and further education institutions.

Members are elected to the Democratic Procedures Committee are elected on a two-year term.

Previous DPC committees

"Special Regions" and "Area Organisations

National Union of Students Areas are support organisations, affiliation to which is open to individual students' unions which are usually (but not always) already affiliated members of the UK-wide National Union of Students of the United Kingdom ("NUS"). Membership of an Area organisation is optional (determined by the normal democratic process at each students' union) and is paid for by subscription in addition to the cost of affiliation to the national body.

Area organisations meet together to support each other through the Areas Political Convention (formerly the Areas National Convention), and are able to attend the National Union's annual conference as non-voting observers. Additionally Area Conveners have sometimes been members of the Executive Committees of the "special regions" (Scotland (NUS Scotland), Wales (NUS Wales), and Northern Ireland (NUS-USI).)

The position of "Areas" within the Constitution of the National Union has long been somewhat controversial. They do not feature in all printed editions of the Constitution, but have not been officially dissolved by the decision-making Annual Conference of the national body. They are nominally autonomous or semi-autonomous, but often use some of the same branding and certainly have access to the resources of their regional and national offices.

The current National Union of Students website has this to say about areas:

At one time almost all NUS regions contained several Area organisations; Scotland for example was divided into "NUS North of Scotland Area", "NUS West of Scotland Area" and "NUS East of Scotland Area". In this example, the East of Scotland organisation tended to work very closely with the national (Scottish) organisation due to being based in the same city, Edinburgh. In more remote parts of the country, the Area organisations are intended to form a useful first point of contact and readily accessible person to assist the local student unions.

Areas normally have a "Convener" who is generally a current student or one who has just graduated, and will take a year, theoretically (but not always) paid, to work for the Area — known as a "sabbatical" in the case of current students, and in this sense following the model of the sabbatical officers of students' unions at individual educational institutions. Occasionally the Convener would serve two or even more years in office. Those Areas able to afford the costs may send their Convener to a training session provided by the National Union. In any event, the regional organisation will normally provide training and support.

Because of their local perspective and autonomous nature, it is not uncommon for Areas to be involved in conflicts with the national organisation. Conversely, political groupings (and the fulfilling of obvious functions and shared goals) within the bodies sometimes draws them into very close co-operation.

West Midlands Area National Union of Students
West Midlands Area National Union of Students (WMANUS) is the oldest of the current National Union of Students Areas and operates as a semi-autonomous organisation of the National Union of Students of the United Kingdom. WMANUS works with affiliated Students' Unions in the West Midlands of England on campaigns, training, union development and other issues of relevance to students in the region. Area organisations are now starting to re-establish themselves across England with the establishment of the South East Area National Union of Student (SEANUS) and the Anglian Union of Students (ANGUS) - with others looking to follow.

WMANUS has two full-time convenors who are supported by a part-time Executive Committee. It holds two Conferences (Spring and Winter) every year to discuss policy, elect its new Executive committee and determine the direction and work of the Area. Its main aims are to represent all students of affiliated Student Union/Associations/Guilds on educational and welfare issues across the West Midlands region. It runs regional wide campaigns as well as specific training events for its Constituent Members (CMs).

References

External links
NUS Governance Structure
The new constitution document
NUS UK Articles and Rules
NEC member John Peart's blog - Map of the Student Movement

Governance Structure of the National Union of Students of the United Kingdom
National Union of Students